Dzikówko  is a village in the administrative district of Gmina Barlinek, within Myślibórz County, West Pomeranian Voivodeship, in north-western Poland.

References

Villages in Myślibórz County